Parakseno Sinesthima (in Greek Παράξενο συναίσθημα meaning Strange feeling) is the 2005 debut album of Greek singer of Cypriot/Lebanese origin Sarbel released in Greek language and released on Sony BMG label. The album was certified gold and was re-released in 2006 in a new edition with a greater number of songs and remixes.

Done mostly in a dance pop style, the album uses many elements of traditional Greek music (Laiki) in modern fashion as well as Middle Eastern music. The main success from the album was "Se pira sovara" (in Greek Σε πήρα σοβαρά), a traditional Tunisian song "Sidi Mansour" by Saber Rebaï. Another song from the album "Skliri kardia" was also a Greek version of "Habibi Dah Nari Narien" made famous Hisham Abbas.

There were four singles released from the album. Besides "Se Pira Sovara", there were "Sokolata", "Enas apo mas" and "Thelo na petakso".

Track listings

Original release (2005)
Skliri kardia (Habibi Dah Nari Narien)
Se pira sovara (with Irini Merkouri)
Paraxeno sinesthima
Monaha esi
De me niazi
Sokolata
Sopa
Peripetia
Zontanos nekros
Ta psihologika sou
Den boris
Zo
Adinaton
Se pira sovara (Sfera mix by Nikos Nikolakopoulos)

Special edition (2006)
Thelo na petaxo
Boro Boro
Sokolata (remix)
Monaha esi (remix)
Skliri kardia (Habibi Dah Nari Narien)
Se pira sovara (with Irini Merkouri)
Paraxeno sinesthima
Monaha esi
De me niazi
Sokolata
Sopa
Peripetia
Zontanos nekros
Ta psihologika sou
Den boris
Zo
Adinaton
Se pira sovara (Sfera mix by Nikos Nikolakopoulos)

2005 debut albums
Sarbel albums